Viktoria Alexeeva (born August 2, 1994) is a Russian foil fencer. At the inaugural 2010 Youth Olympics in Singapore she won two Olympic branded silver medals, becoming the only Russian fencer ever achieving this feat.

References

External links 
 
 
 

1994 births
Living people
Russian female foil fencers
Fencers at the 2010 Summer Youth Olympics
Sportspeople from Kazan
21st-century Russian women